389 Industria (prov. designation:  or ) is a large background asteroid, approximately  in diameter, located in the central region of the asteroid belt. It was discovered on 8 March 1894, by French astronomer Auguste Charlois at the Nice Observatory. The stony S-type asteroid has a rotation period of 8.5 hours. It was named after the Latin word for "diligence".

References

External links 
 Lightcurve Database Query (LCDB), at www.minorplanet.info
 Dictionary of Minor Planet Names, Google books
 Asteroids and comets rotation curves, CdR – Geneva Observatory, Raoul Behrend
 Discovery Circumstances: Numbered Minor Planets (1)-(5000) – Minor Planet Center
 
 

000389
Discoveries by Auguste Charlois
Named minor planets
000389
000389
18940308